Hummuli Parish was a rural municipality of the Estonian county of Valga.

Settlements
Small borough
Hummuli

Villages
Aitsra - Alamõisa - Jeti - Kulli - Piiri - Puide - Ransi - Soe

References